Claudel-Hobson was a series of British carburettors manufactured by H. M. Hobson Ltd.

Introduced in 1908, they were widely used on British car and aircraft engines in the early 20th century. Applications included Sunbeam automobiles as well as Armstrong Siddeley, Bristol, de Havilland, and Napier aircraft engines.

References

External links
 Historywebsite.co.uk

Engine fuel system technology
Carburetor manufacturers